Sugar panning, or simply panning, is a method for adding a sugar-based "shell" to confectionery or nuts. Popular products that employ this process in their manufacture include dragées, chocolate buttons, gobstoppers, konpeitō and jelly beans. Jelly beans use soft panning while the others are examples of hard panning. The process was initially invented in 17th-century France to make jordan almonds.

Method

The same process is used for hard and soft panning, but different ingredients and speeds are used for each. A dragée pan, a spherical or oval pan mounted on an angled spinning post, is used. The pan is open to the air to allow ingredients to be added and the syrup to dry. The centers are put in the dragée pan, and syrup is added. When the pan is rotated, the syrup is evenly distributed over the centers, drying as a layer. Soft panned layers can be quite thick and do not preserve the shape of the center very well. Hard-panned layers take longer to dry and can be as thin as 10-14μm.

Many types of center may be used, but they must be strong enough to not break during the tumbling. Nuts should be dried and sealed, such as with gum arabic and flour, to prevent oils from escaping and discoloring the candy shell. Other centers may be precoated for sealing or to improve the syrup sticking to the center. Chewing gum is difficult to pan without precoating.

Materials
Soft panning uses a syrup that will not crystallize, such as glucose. To assist in drying, powdered sugar or caster sugar is added during processing.

See also
Enrober — a machine that typically covers confections with chocolate

References 

Confectionery
Cooking techniques
Culinary terminology